Makówiec Duży  is a village in the administrative district of Gmina Dobre, within Mińsk County, Masovian Voivodeship, in east-central Poland.

Rector of the Jan Matejko Academy of Fine Arts in Kraków, a renowned sculptor Konstanty Laszczka of the Young Poland Movement, was born in Makówiec Duży in 1865.

References

Villages in Mińsk County